Kothapally is one of the Villages in Gambhiraopet mandal which is in Karimnagar District in Telangana State in India. Rajpet, Gambhiraopet, Lingannapet, Kollamaddi, Srigada, Shilajinagar and Mucharla are the surrounding villages to this village.

Education 

Kothapally has an average literacy rate of 62%. From a decade there has been a good response for education. Literacy rate has been improved a lot. Girl education is highly encouraged in the village. There are 4 Mandal parishad primary schools, 1 Zilla Parishad High School, 4 Anganwadi centres and 2 English medium schools (Saraswathi school and SVS school) in the village. People prefer colleges in Hyderabad, Kamareddy and Karimnagar for higher studies. Hundreds of students go to colleges in Karimnagar as day scholars. Students completed Intermediate are around 850, Graduation are 350 and Post graduation are 200. Many students are joining in BTech/B.E courses. Recently professional degrees are becoming popular in the village and people are attracted to them.

Transport

Kothapalli has an existing railway station (KPHI) and is connected to Nizambad-Peddapalli railway line. Kothapalli is also a part of the new Kothapalli-Manoharabad railway line which will connect Karimnagar to Hyderabad and multiple important districts in between which were hitherto unconnected on the railway map.

References

http://karimnagar.nic.in/
http://indiapincode.in/kothapalli_karimnagar
http://www.gloriousindia.com/unleashed/place.php?id=13170
https://archive.today/20121218171953/http://panchayatdirectory.gov.in/adminreps/viewpansumSQL.asp?selstate=5007&parenttype=B&ptype=V
http://epanchayat.ap.nic.in/
https://web.archive.org/web/20120723100049/http://www.indiademocracy.org/index.php/electedofficials/stateList/type/MP
http://www.indiafreelist.com/details/andhra-pradesh-rto-registration-numbers-202

Villages in Karimnagar district